David García Santana (born 25 February 1982) is a Spanish footballer who plays as a central defender for UD Tamaraceite.

He spent his entire professional career with Las Palmas, appearing in 474 competitive games.

Club career
García was born in Maspalomas, Gran Canaria. After finishing his youth career with CD Maspalomas, he made his debut as a senior with UD Vecindario in 2001, in Segunda División B.

In the summer of 2003, García joined Segunda División club UD Las Palmas. He made his professional debut on 17 September, starting in a 2–1 away win against Elche CF. He appeared in only seven matches during the season, as his team suffered relegation.

García scored his first professional goal on 10 December 2006, the last in a 1–1 draw at Albacete Balompié. He was an undisputed starter for the side the following seasons, being also named captain in 2008.

García played 37 matches in the 2014–15 campaign, helping Las Palmas get promoted to La Liga after a 13-year absence. He made his debut in the competition at the age of 33, starting in a 0–2 home loss to SD Eibar on 3 October 2015.

On 5 March 2016, García scored his first goal of the season to help his team to their third consecutive win, heading home from an assist by Jonathan Viera for the game's only goal at Villarreal CF. He left the Estadio Gran Canaria at the end of 2018–19, with the club back in the second tier.

García subsequently continued his career in the lower leagues while remaining in his native region, retiring at 40.

Career statistics

Club

References

External links
Las Palmas official profile 

1982 births
Living people
People from Gran Canaria
Sportspeople from the Province of Las Palmas
Spanish footballers
Footballers from the Canary Islands
Association football defenders
La Liga players
Segunda División players
Segunda División B players
Tercera División players
Segunda Federación players
UD Vecindario players
UD Las Palmas players
UD Tamaraceite footballers